Drop Dead Gorgeous is a 1999 American satirical mockumentary black comedy film about a small town beauty pageant, directed by Michael Patrick Jann, and starring Kirsten Dunst, Ellen Barkin, Brittany Murphy, Allison Janney, Denise Richards, Kirstie Alley, and Amy Adams in her film debut. The satirical dynamics of a Minnesota town unfold as multiple contestants in the regional American Teen Princess Pageant begin to die suspiciously.

The film has gained new fans with time and is now regarded as a cult film.

Plot
In 1995, Mount Rose, Minnesota is preparing for the annual Sarah Rose Cosmetics Mount Rose American Teen Princess Pageant beauty pageant. Ambitious, optimistic Amber Atkins signs up to follow in the footsteps of her idol Diane Sawyer. Her mother, Annette is a former contestant. Amber works after school in the mortuary, applying makeup to corpses. They live in a small trailer near their friend Loretta. Fellow contestant Rebecca ("Becky") Leeman is the daughter of the richest man in town. His wife, Gladys Leeman is the head of the pageant organizing committee and former winner. Business connections between their furniture store and the pageant judges cause many to fear the contest will be rigged. In the days leading up to the pageant, many odd events occur around town, including contestant Tammy Curry (president of the gun club), who is killed when her tractor explodes; and then the death of a boy Becky liked, but interested in Amber, ruled a hunting accident. Amber decides to pull out after receiving a threatening note and her mother is injured in an explosion at their mobile home, but reconsiders to make her mother proud. At the dress rehearsal, fellow contestant Jenelle Betz swaps numbers with Amber. Midway through Jenelle's rehearsal performance, a stage light knocks her unconscious and renders her deaf. Luckily, Jenelle knows American sign language so she claims that despite dropping out of the pageant, she has never been happier.

At the pageant, Amber's dance costume disappears. She blames Becky and they have a catfight. Pageant choreographer Chloris Klinghagen gives Amber a new costume, however Iris and Gladys say she can't perform as the new costume was not approved weeks ago. When Lisa finds Amber crying, she drops out to give her approved costume. Amber gets a standing ovation for her tap dance number. Becky sings a cringe-worthy song, dancing with a life-size Jesus doll on a crucifix, both amusing and horrifying the audience. The winners are announced, cheerleader Leslie Miller is second runner-up, Amber is first runner-up, with Becky winning. During Becky's victory parade the next day, she is killed in a freak accident when her elaborate swan float (her father had it made in Mexico, to save money) bursts into flames and explodes. A grief-stricken Gladys flies into a blind rage, admitting to being responsible for all the shenanigans, and is immediately arrested. Amber becomes the new pageant winner. At the state competition, Amber wins the Minnesota title by default after the other contestants get food poisoning, receiving an all-expenses-paid trip to the national pageant. Upon arrival, Amber and the other state winners are devastated to find that the cosmetics company was shut down for tax evasion. This sends all the contestants except Amber on a rampage, vandalizing the property.

A few years later, Gladys escapes from prison and is sniping from the top of the Mount Rose supermarket, declaring her intent to take revenge on Amber. During the six-hour police standoff, a television reporter at the scene is hit by a stray bullet. Amber quickly picks up the microphone, taking over reporting the story, impressing the news station with her poise and confidence. Amber becomes co-anchor of the evening news for Minneapolis–St. Paul WAZB-TV, thus fulfilling her dream of possibly becoming the next Diane Sawyer.

Cast

Background
The movie is set in the fictional town of Mount Rose, Minnesota. The town is based on Rosemount, where the writer, Lona Williams, grew up. The film was originally titled "Dairy Queens" but was changed for legal reasons.

The characters in the movie all sport exaggerated, over the top parodies of Minnesota accents.

The film was shot throughout the Carver County area, mainly in Waconia, Minnesota, although names of real Minnesota communities were shown on the sashes of contestants later in the movie.

News reporter Diane Sawyer is mentioned throughout the film as Kirsten Dunst's character Amber Atkins's idol as Sawyer was a former beauty pageant winner. Amber's other idols include her beauty pageant mother who raised her alone in a trailer park and the previous year's winner who is hospitalized for anorexia. Competing in the beauty pageant for a scholarship is juxtaposed against the opportunities that boys have in leaving "Mount Rose" such as hockey scholarships and prison.

Two Melissa Manchester songs are featured in the film as songs used in the talent portion by contestants. Mary lip-syncs "Don't Cry Out Loud", while Jenelle sings and signs "Through the Eyes of Love". Fanfare for the Common Man is played to introduce the parade for the rigged competition and the plight of Hank. "Are we on Cops again?" is used throughout the movie when the "mockumentary" film crew is spotted. Richard Strauss' "Also Sprach Zarathustra", inspired by Friedrich Nietzsche, is played when the Minnesota state pageant is interrupted by the violent illness of the contestants who ate shellfish (all except Amber).

Reception

Critical response
The film received mostly negative reviews.  

Many critics liked the modern interpretation of the pageant world although just as many people disliked the film as a whole. Allison Janney and Denise Richards in particular received praise for their performances from a number of critics. Dennis Harvey of Variety called the film "a fitfully amusing satire that would have gained a lot of mileage from just a tad more subtlety." Harvey says the writing is not sophisticated enough to pull off the some of the jokes without being condescending. Otherwise he praises the pacing, the performances, and the clever visual casting. Roger Ebert liked the idea of the film, but wrote that the script failed to translate into screenplay and is never quite funny enough, due to subtle miscalculations of production and performance.
Jeff Vice of the Deseret News criticized the film for being derivative, comparing it to the 1975 pageant comedy Smile, and also Fargo and the mockumentary Waiting for Guffman. Entertainment Weekly gave the film a D grade, and compared the film unfavorably to Smile, and The Positively True Adventures of the Alleged Texas Cheerleader-Murdering Mom.

Box office
Drop Dead Gorgeous grossed $10.6 million in the United States and Canada, against a budget of $15 million.

Cult status 
The film has gained new fans with time and is regarded as a cult film. In 2011, Allison Janney stated that she is approached by more fans of this film than for her Emmy-winning tenure on The West Wing.

In July 2019, coinciding with the 20th anniversary of its release, Drop Dead Gorgeous was released for streaming for the first time on Hulu, which was "met with a host of celebratory tweets, particularly among women and queer people, who have long recognized it as a cult classic", according to The Independent's Adam White. It attracted retrospective praise from the likes of The Independent, The Guardian, Teen Vogue, The New Yorker and E! News. The New Yorker's Jia Tolentino credited the movie's "transformation" from a flop to a "venerated artifact of Y2K camp" to its slow discovery on VHS and DVD by teenage girls who identified with its truthfulness and particular brand of dark humor. Tolentino summed up the movie as "...offensive, for sure—completely awful, really, and possibly deadly. It is also irreplaceable, hilarious, surprisingly tender, and lavishly, magnificently absurd." The Guardian praised the film's "vicious indecency", describing it as "...trashy, wonderful, endlessly quotable, and...20 years ahead of its time."

Adam White further praised the movie's radical departure from lighthearted teen movies of the late 1990s, stating that it "was made for a generation of freaks and outsiders, whose ambitions, oddities, queerness and poverty were otherwise ignored by anything similarly mainstream or funny." He added that it was "acidic and truthful about beauty, class and ambition, satirised all-American moralism and blew up Denise Richards, then fresh from Wild Things, as she rode a giant paper-maché swan." Alex Zaragoza of Teen Vogue echoed other reviews in praising the movie's appeal to outsiders and misfits, and departing from the teen rom-com tropes of other movies released that year like 10 Things I Hate About You and She's All That. Zaragoza stated that the girls in Drop Dead Gorgeous "don't yearn to land their respective dream boy...they're too busy trying not to get capped by a crazed mother-daughter duo... and striving to break out of the confines of their small town." He further described it as a "wild, absurdly portrayed story that's fundamentally about small-town struggles and overcoming the adversity of being born into a class that lacks opportunities to ultimately earn the life you've dreamed of for yourself. It's unabashed weirdness and mockumentary-style filmmaking made it an immediate cult classic..."

Soundtrack

References

External links

 

1990s black comedy films
1990s mockumentary films
1990s satirical films
1990s teen comedy films
1999 comedy films
1999 films
1999 directorial debut films
American black comedy films
American mockumentary films
American satirical films
American teen comedy films
Films about murder
Films about beauty pageants
Films scored by Mark Mothersbaugh
Films set in 1995
Films set in Minnesota
Films shot in Minnesota
New Line Cinema films
1990s English-language films
1990s American films